Balla Camara  was a Guinean economist and politician. He served in the council of the Politburo of the First Republic of Guinea as Secretary of State from 1963. He was also a Secretary for Internal Trade and Commerce.

References

20th-century Guinean economists
Government ministers of Guinea
Possibly living people
Year of birth missing